Call of the Klondike is a 1950 American Northern film directed by Frank McDonald and starring Kirby Grant, Anne Gwynne, and Lynne Roberts. The film was the fourth in the series of ten films featuring Kirby Grant as a Canadian Mountie.

Plot

Cast
 Kirby Grant as Corporal Rod Webb 
 Anne Gwynne as Nancy Craig 
 Lynne Roberts as Emily Mallory 
 Tom Neal as Tom Mallory 
 Russell Simpson as Andy McKay 
 Marc Krah as Mencheck 
 Paul Bryar as Henchman Fred Foley 
 Pat Gleason as Billy 
 Duke York as Henchman Luke  
 Roy Gordon as Major Robertson  
 Chinook as Chinook, Webb's Dog

See also
Kirby Grant as Robb Webb Mountie Series

 Trail of the Yukon (1949)
 The Wolf Hunters (1949)
 Snow Dog (1950)
 Call of the Klondike (1950)
 Northwest Territory (1951)
 Yukon Manhunt (1951)
 Yukon Gold (1952)
 Fangs of the Arctic (1953)
 Northern Patrol (1953)
 Yukon Vengeance (1954)

References

Bibliography
 Drew, Bernard. Motion Picture Series and Sequels: A Reference Guide. Routledge, 2013.

External links
 

1950 films
1950 Western (genre) films
American Western (genre) films
American black-and-white films
Corporal Rod Webb (film series)
1950s English-language films
Films based on American novels
Films based on works by James Oliver Curwood
Films directed by Frank McDonald
Films produced by Lindsley Parsons
Monogram Pictures films
Northern (genre) films
Royal Canadian Mounted Police in fiction
1950s American films